Malintha Krishantha Gajanayake (born October 5, 1980, in Colombo) is a Sri Lankan first class cricketer. He is a right-handed middle order batsman.

A promising under age player, he captained both the Sri Lankan Under-15  and Under-19 teams. The latter he led in the 2000 Under-19's World Cup at home in Sri Lanka. He made his Twenty20 debut on 17 August 2004, for Chilaw Marians Cricket Club in the 2004 SLC Twenty20 Tournament.

See also
 List of Chilaw Marians Cricket Club players

References

External links
 Cricinfo Profile

1980 births
Living people
Sri Lankan cricketers
Tamil Union Cricket and Athletic Club cricketers
Chilaw Marians Cricket Club cricketers
Uva cricketers